Hochhausen is a district of Tauberbischofsheim with 712 residents.

Geography
Hochhausen is located north-northwest of Tauberbischofsheim in the Tauberfranken region of Franconia.

History
Hochhausen is one of seven districts of Tauberbischofsheim. The other districts are the town of Tauberbischofsheim, as well as Dienstadt, Distelhausen, Dittigheim, Dittwar and Impfingen.

Hochhausen was incorporated to Tauberbischofsheim during the local government reform in Baden-Württemberg on January 1, 1971.

Further reading
 Corinna Egerer, Michael Latzel: Tauberbischofsheim. Fränkische Nachrichten, Tauberbischofsheim 2005, S. 148–161 (Kapitel: „Stadtteile“ Tauberbischofsheims) (german).

References

External links

Villages in Baden-Württemberg
Main-Tauber-Kreis
Historic Jewish communities